Bass Van Gilst (April 14, 1911 – December 2, 1996) was an American politician who served in the Iowa Senate from 1965 to 1985.

References

1911 births
1996 deaths
Democratic Party Iowa state senators
20th-century American politicians